The Polestar 5 is an upcoming high-performance battery electric executive sedan to be produced by Swedish automobile manufacturer Volvo Cars and sold under the Polestar brand in 2024.

Overview

The Polestar 5 was first previewed by the 2020 Polestar Precept concept car. In June 2022, a prototype for the Polestar 5 was shown at the Goodwood Festival of Speed.

The Polestar 5 is based on the Sustainable Experience Architecture 1 (SEA1) platform, also used by the upcoming Polestar 3 SUV.

Specifications

References

5
Upcoming car models
Sports sedans